Astroblepus jurubidae is a species of catfish of the family Astroblepidae. It is endemic to the Pacific draining rivers of Colombia.

References

Bibliography
 Eschmeyer, William N., ed. 1998. Catalog of Fishes. Special Publication of the Center for Biodiversity Research and Information, num. 1, vol. 1–3. California Academy of Sciences. San Francisco, California, United States. 2905. .

Astroblepus
Endemic fauna of Colombia
Freshwater fish of Colombia
Fish described in 1944
Taxa named by Henry Weed Fowler